Eran-Khwarrah-Yazdegerd (meaning "Iran, glory of Yazdegerd") was a short-lived province of the Sasanian Empire located in the northern part of the Gorgan province. The province was founded by shah Yazdegerd II (r. 438-457).

See also
 Khorasan

Sources 
 

Provinces of the Sasanian Empire